Richárd Weisz (30 April 1879 – 4 December 1945) was a Hungarian heavyweight Greco-Roman wrestler. He competed at the 1906 Intercalated Games and at the 1908 Summer Olympics and won a gold medal in 1908.

Weisz was born in Budapest, Hungary, and was Jewish. He trained in athletics and rowing before changing to wrestling. He won an unofficial national wrestling title in 1899, and then seven consecutive official titles in 1903–1909. He also competed in weightlifting and won the national heavyweight championships in 1905–1908. He was banned by the Hungarian amateur wrestling federation for participating in a professional wrestling bout against Stanislaus Zbyszko, and after that performed in a circus. His amateur status was restored before the 1912 Olympics, but he declined to compete due to waning motivation.

See also
 List of select Jewish wrestlers

References

External links

dataOlympics profile
Nemzetisport profile 
mek profile 

1879 births
1945 deaths
Sport wrestlers from Budapest
Olympic wrestlers of Hungary
Wrestlers at the 1906 Intercalated Games
Wrestlers at the 1908 Summer Olympics
Hungarian male sport wrestlers
Olympic gold medalists for Hungary
Olympic medalists in wrestling
Medalists at the 1908 Summer Olympics
20th-century Hungarian people